James A. Michener's Texas (also called Texas) is a 1994 ABC television miniseries directed by Richard Lang and starring Patrick Duffy as Stephen F. Austin, Stacy Keach as Sam Houston, Chelsea Field as Mattie Quimper, Rick Schroder as Otto McNab, Grant Show as William B. Travis, David Keith as James Bowie, John Schneider as Davy Crockett, María Conchita Alonso as Lucia, and Benjamin Bratt as Benito Garza. The film is narrated by Charlton Heston. Aaron Spelling was the executive producer.

Adapted from the 1985 historical fiction novel Texas by James A. Michener, it includes only the section of the book related to Texas Independence and the Battle of San Jacinto. The novel is more wide-ranging, starting with Spanish explorer Álvar Núñez Cabeza de Vaca and ends in the modern day.

Although produced for television, Texas was released on home video first. This decision was not due to its quality, but to recoup its $12 million production cost feasibly as broadcast networks had shied away from expensive productions.

Plot
The year is 1821. The vast, unsettled territory that will one day be known as Texas still belongs to Mexico. But the forces that will shape the future of this sprawling land have already been set in motion. It begins with Mexico's infamous and brutal General Santa Anna and explodes into an armed revolt waged by such legendary names as the fiery and headstrong Sam Houston, Stephen Austin, the Father of Texas and the immortal heroes of the Alamo: Davy Crockett and Jim Bowie. Set against the thrilling backdrop of America's turbulent frontier, Texas weaves a dazzling, epic tapestry of conflict romance and adventure. It's the story of an inspiring fight for freedom and statehood - and of the soldiers, settlers, outlaws and empire-builders caught up in their young homeland's stormy quest to fulfill its extraordinary destiny!

References

External links
 
 Texas (1994) at Rotten Tomatoes

1994 television films
1994 films
1990s American television miniseries
Films based on American novels
Cultural depictions of Davy Crockett
Television series set in the 1820s
Television series set in the 1830s
Television series about the history of the United States
Adaptations of works by James A. Michener
Films scored by Lee Holdridge
Films directed by Richard Lang (director)
Cultural depictions of James Bowie